Ummi Ibrahim is a Kannywood actress who became known in the film Jinsi where got her name Zeezee.

Career 
There is controversy about the actress in the industry as she claims superiority. This sparked reaction among her colleague since she was last seen in the Kannywood in 2006.

Personal life 
Ummi was rumored to have dated the former head of state, General  Ibrahim Babangida. She confirmed they are still friends in an interview with an online newspaper.

The Nollywood actress was also an ex-girlfriend to Timaya, the musician from Benue state.

The actress was duped of 450 million of fraudsters after a man who posed as a business partner brought a deal of crude oil. She was consoled by fans and colleague since she contemplated suicide after the incident.

Ummi prided herself in that she doesn't put on makeup since her natural beauty is enough.

Filmography 
Jinsi
Flag of Love
Yan uwa
Gambiza
Gender

See also 
Hadizu Aliyu
Halimah Atete
Hauwa Maina

References 

Living people
1987 births
Nigerian actresses
Nigerian actresses by ethnic or national origin
21st-century Nigerian actresses